The 1981 Benson & Hedges Championships was a men's tennis tournament played on indoor carpet courts at the Wembley Arena in London, England that was part of the 1981 Volvo Grand Prix. It was the sixth edition of the tournament and was held from 9 November until 14 November 1981. Second-seeded Jimmy Connors won the singles title.

Finals

Singles
 Jimmy Connors defeated  John McEnroe 3–6, 2–6, 6–3, 6–4, 6–2
 It was Connors' 4th singles title of the year and the 89th of his career.

Doubles
 Ferdi Taygan /  Sherwood Stewart defeated  John McEnroe /  Peter Fleming 7–5, 6–7, 6–4

See also
 Connors–McEnroe rivalry

References

External links
 ITF tournament edition details

Benson and Hedges Championships
Wembley Championships
Benson and Hedges Championships
Benson and Hedges Championships
Benson and Hedges Championships
Tennis in London